Christine E. Greig (born January 11, 1963) is a former Democratic politician from Michigan, who represented the 37th District which comprises Farmington and Farmington Hills in the Michigan House of Representatives. In her second term, Greig also served as the Minority Floor Leader, and served as Democratic Leader in her third term. Prior to her election to the Michigan Legislature, Greig served as the executive director of the Farmington/Farmington Hills Education Foundation.

History

Personal biography
Christine Jeffirs Greig was born on January 11, 1963, and grew up in Plymouth, Indiana. She graduated as salutatorian and student body president from Plymouth High School in 1981 and went on to earn a bachelor's degree in American Studies and Computer Applications from the University of Notre Dame. She was named a Notre Dame Scholar, designating her in the top 20% of incoming Notre Dame students.

She has three sons and resides in Farmington Hills, Mi.

Professional life

After her education, Greig worked for Andersen Consulting as an application software expert, and would later work for Kmart Corporation, managing the implementation of their human resource systems. In 1994, she became the co-owner of Fulcrum Computer Services, based in Farmington Hills.

Prior to her election into office, Greig founded and directed the Farmington/Farmington Hills Education Foundation, a non-profit organization focused on providing support for the students of Farmington and Farmington Hills public schools.

Political career
Greig was elected to serve the 37th District in the Michigan House of Representatives in November 2014  In her first term in the Michigan House, Christine Greig served on the committees of Communications and Technology, Education, and Workforce and Talent Development. She was appointed Assistant Floor Leader and served as the Vice Chair of the Progressive Women's Caucus.  She was also selected to participate in the 2015 Bowhay Institute Legislative Leadership Development (BILLD) program, a fellowship program sponsored by the Council of State Governments Midwest. In her second term, she was elected Minority Floor Leader. In her final term, she served as the House Democratic Leader of the 52 member democratic caucus, only the second woman to lead a House caucus.

2014 election

On August 5, 2014, Greig defeated Barry Brickner and Theresa Rich in the Democratic Primary for the 37th district for the Michigan House of Representatives. She then defeated Republican Party candidate Richard Learner in the general election on November 4, 2014.

2016 election
Christine Greig ran unopposed in the Democratic Primary for the 37th district for the Michigan House of Representatives. She defeated both Republican Party candidate Mitch Swoboda and Libertarian Party candidate James Young. In her second term in the Michigan House, Christine Greig was elected by her democratic colleagues to serve as the Minority Floor Leader.  She was a member of Legislative Council, Government Operations, and the House Fiscal Agency Governing committees.

2018 election

Once again, Christine Greig ran unopposed in the Democratic Primary for the 37th district for the Michigan House of Representatives. She defeated Republican Party candidate Mitch Swodoba in the general election. In her third term, Representative Greig was elected by the House Democrats to serve as House Democratic Leader.

Other work
Greig currently serves on the Board of Advisors of Let America Vote, an organization founded by former Missouri Secretary of State Jason Kander that aims to end voter suppression.

References

External links
 Representative Greig's official website
 Michigan House's Democratic Caucus Website for Representative Greig

1963 births
Living people
21st-century American politicians
21st-century American women politicians
Democratic Party members of the Michigan House of Representatives
People from Farmington Hills, Michigan
People from Plymouth, Indiana
Notre Dame College of Arts and Letters alumni
Women state legislators in Michigan